Jordan Lake is a lake in Elmore County, Alabama.  The closest city is Wetumpka.

It is a recreational lake with fishing opportunities for largemouth bass, spotted bass, bluegill and other sunfish, crappie, catfish, striped bass, hybrid and white bass. The lake has two public access sites.

Owned and operated by Alabama Power, the lake was impounded December 31, 1928 and named for the mother of Reuben and Sidney Mitchell, who were instrumental in the construction of Mitchell Dam, also on the Coosa River and also run by Alabama Power.  Jordan Dam is a concrete arch dam, 125 feet high, built for hydropower generation with a 100 megawatt generating capacity.

References 

Dams in Alabama
Hydroelectric power plants in Alabama
Reservoirs in Alabama
Alabama Power dams
Buildings and structures in Elmore County, Alabama
Dams completed in 1928
Bodies of water of Elmore County, Alabama
1928 establishments in Alabama